St James's Church of England High School is a Coeducational Church of England secondary school located on Lucas Road, Farnworth in Greater Manchester, England.

History
The school was a secondary modern school. It became a comprehensive in the early 1970s, and effectively became the only school in the area when the former Farnworth Grammar School was demolished. There is also a St James C of E Primary School in Farnworth, on Hillside Avenue.

Exam success
The school is continually achieving high GCSE grades, with 61% of pupils attaining the equivalent to 5 GCSEs at grade C or above. The school achieved sports college status in September 2005. The new sports area includes a dance studio, a multi-use games area (MUGA) and a sports hall. St James' is a respectable school in all areas, especially in charity work, for which they raise over £5,000 each year. The sports college status has now been removed.
The school recently achieved its highest ever exam success in 2008 with 73% of pupils achieving 5 or more Grade A* to C G.C.S.Es. With 65% of pupils achieving 5 or more Grade A* to C G.C.S.Es including Maths and English. But, the school has refused to publish any results for the 2015 GCSE results.
Headteacher- Mrs C. Anderson
Deputy Headteacher- Mr C. Lamb
Assistant Headteachers - Mrs C. Thornton, Mr A. Leigh, Mr. M Pearce, Mr D Hulme, Mrs R Iozzi, Mrs L Quarmby, Mr M. Bowden

Charity work
The school has a rich history of charity work and fundraising.
In 2004, the school started a fundraising project called 'B The Change'. This project was to raise money for a selection of charities including Ryan's Well and Fairtrade. It proved to be very successful - the school creating 'B THE CHANGE" wristbands as a part of this in the then school colours of blue and yellow; the proceeds of whose sale went to charity.
Charities that the school has supported include Bisee Books, the Fairtrade campaign and Winter Watch. The school continues to support these charities, as well as Masooli School in Uganda. St James's recently hosted a choir from the Pearl of Africa Childcare charity during their UK tour.

Ofsted Outstanding
Following the appointment of a new headteacher, Mrs T Lewyckyj, St James was inspected by Ofsted and received an overall grade of Outstanding. This was the only secondary school in Bolton to receive this honour at the time of inspection, and places St James in the top 2% of schools nationally. This inspection is dated back in 2011.
Since this inspection a new headteacher 'Mrs C. Anderson; has been appointed after Mrs T. Lewyckyj was made head of the bishop Fraser Trust which St James is a member of along with 2 other schools within the Bolton district

Notable former pupils
 Laurence Robertson - Conservative MP for Tewkesbury (when a secondary modern and later transferred to Farnworth Grammar).
 Jason Wilcox - Former England, Blackburn Rovers and Leeds United footballer. 1994-95 Premier League winner with Blackburn.
 Luke Daniels - goalkeeper who has played for West Bromwich Albion, Scunthorpe United and Brentford. Currently with Championship side Middlesbrough.
 Tom Aldred - professional footballer currently playing for A-League side Brisbane Roar. Has previously been with Watford, Blackpool and Motherwell.
 George Miller - professional footballer currently playing for Doncaster Rovers in the English Football League

References

https://www.st-james.bolton.sch.uk/index.asp
http://www.thebishopfrasertrust.co.uk/

External links
 Website

Secondary schools in the Metropolitan Borough of Bolton
Church of England secondary schools in the Diocese of Manchester
Academies in the Metropolitan Borough of Bolton
Farnworth